Thomas Hunter Campbell McDonell (born May 2, 1986) is an American actor. He is known for his role as Finn Collins on the CW post-apocalyptic series The 100.

Early life
McDonell was born and raised in Manhattan, New York, and attended boarding school in Andover, Massachusetts. He graduated from New York University. His mother, Joanie, who is of Jewish descent, is a writer, and his father, Terry McDonell, is editor of Sports Illustrated. His brother is writer Nick McDonell.

Career
McDonell starred as Finn Collins in the post-apocalyptic show The 100. He also played a role in The Forbidden Kingdom, and in Twelve. McDonell played the main role in 2011 teen film Prom as Jesse Richter. He has guest-starred in Suburgatory as Scott Strauss, Tessa's boyfriend. He is the lead singer and guitarist for the band Moon. As a visual artist, McDonell has exhibited his own work internationally, and has curated several exhibitions including a tunnel exhibit at the historic Southwest Museum site in Los Angeles, a video art show at a Best Buy in New York, and a monochrome painting exhibition at the ArcLight Hollywood movie theater complex. His conceptual fashion editorials and photographs have been published in print and online in magazines including the Marfa Journal, Buffalo Zine, Teen Vogue, and F Magazine.

Filmography

Film

Television

Music videos

References

External links
 

1986 births
21st-century American male actors
American male film actors
American male television actors
American people of Jewish descent
Living people
Male actors from New York City
New York University alumni
People from Manhattan